Payakaraopeta is a town in Anakapalli district in the state of Andhra Pradesh in India. Payakaraopeta town  is a gate Way of Visakhapatnam. Tuni and Payakaraopeta Towns are twin towns in Andhra Pradesh. Payakaraopeta Town is fastest growing town in Andhra Pradesh.

Demographics
As of Census 2021 the town has a population of 182,878. Average Sex Ratio of the town is of 1038 against state average of 993. Population of Children with age of 0-6 is 2864 which is 10.61 % of total population of Payakaraopeta. Child Sex Ratio in Payakaraopeta is around 978 compared to Andhra Pradesh state average of 939. Literacy rate of the town is 76.81 % higher than state average of 67.02%.

Transport
Payakaraopet town has an APSRTC bus station from where there are buses to Anakapalli, Visakhapatnam, Rajahmundry and Kakinada.It is located at a distance of 2km from Tuni. State runs APS RTC bus services from many cities in the State to this town. Being next to Tuni railway station, you can go anywhere in the country from this railway station.

Politics

Assembly constituency
Payakaraopeta is an assembly constituency in Andhra Pradesh.

List of Elected Members:
1951 - Raja Sagi Suryanarayana Raju
1962 - Mande Pitchaiah
1967 and 1972 - Gantlana Suryanarayana
1978 - Maruthi Adeyya
1983 - Sumana Gantela
1989 and 1994 - Kakara Nookaraju
1999 and 2004 - Chengala Venata Rao
2009 - Golla Baburao (Congress)
2012 - Golla Baburao resigned
2012 - Golla Baburao (YSRCP)
2014 - Vangalapudi Anitha (TDP)
2019 - Golla Baburao (ysrcp)

Education
The primary and secondary school education is imparted by government, aided and private schools, under the School Education Department of the state. The medium of instruction followed by different schools are English, Telugu.

References

Cities and towns in Anakapalli district